Cheska Garcia Kramer (born Francesca Marie Velasco Garcia; July 24, 1980) is a Filipino actress and model.

Early life
Cheska Garcia was born in Makati, Philippines to Francisco Pablo Pellicer Garcia, a Spanish mestizo, and Maria Celeste Dahlia Villalobos Velasco, an Ilongga from Roxas City, Capiz.
. She is the middle of three children. Her younger brother, Patrick, is also an actor. Her older brother, Pichon, has appeared in many commercials. The actresses Sharmaine Arnaiz and Bunny Paras, who are sisters, are her maternal cousins.

Career
In 1992, Garcia began her television career, along with her brother Patrick; both appeared as cast members for Ang TV until 1996.

In 2015, Garcia hosted Mommy Hacks, a parenting lifestyle show on CNN Philippines, with Rica Peralejo-Bonifacio. The show is renewed for a second season but was renamed Mommy Manual.

Onscreen she is often cast as the female antagonist.

Personal life
On October 9, 2008, Garcia married Doug Kramer, a professional basketball player in the Philippine Basketball Association for the GlobalPort. They have three children - Clair Kendra, Scarlett Louvelle, and Gavin Phoenix. She chose to give up her show business career to become a full-time mother.

Filmography

Film

Television
 Ang TV as Self
 Gimik as Corrine Apostol
 Tropang Trumpo
 Esperanza as Joanna
 Sana Ay Ikaw Na Nga
 Encantadia
 Us Girls
 Agawin Mo Man Ang Lahat as Sissy Lizadores-Valverde
 Ako si Kim Sam Soon
 Iisa Pa Lamang
 Carlo J. Caparas' Totoy Bato
 It's Showtime
 Mommy Hacks (2015)
 Mommy Manual (2016)

Awards
 Ulirang Ina Awards Foundation, Inc.
 Tanyag na Ulirang Ina Award 2017

References

External links

Star Magic
Filipino television actresses
Filipino television personalities
Filipino people of Indian descent
Filipino people of Spanish descent
Living people
People from Dagupan
People from Makati
Actresses from Metro Manila
1980 births